"Blue Skies" is the only official single for English folk band Noah and the Whale's album The First Days of Spring. It was released on 24 August 2009. The song was not only (by default) the album's lead single, but also served as a 'theme' for the album, with excerpts appearing throughout the other tracks, most notably on Our Window.

Music video
The video for the song is introduced by the conversation between two friends, when one of them suggests that they should "go on" and live, which they had only done "a long time ago". It also serves as the film's trailer.

In pop culture
"Blue Skies" is featured in the official trailer for Alexander Payne's 2011 film, "The Descendants" starring George Clooney It was also used in the One Tree Hill episode "Some Roads Lead Nowhere" which first aired on 7 December 2009.

Track listing

Charts

Release history

References

2009 singles
Noah and the Whale songs
2009 songs
Mercury Records singles
Rock ballads